The 32nd Field Artillery Regiment is a distinguished and highly-decorated  field artillery regiment of the United States Army, first Constituted in 1918.

Lineage
Constituted in the Regular Army as the 32nd Field Artillery and assigned to the 11th Infantry Division (United States) 5 July 1918.

Distinctive unit insignia
Description
A gold color metal and enamel device 1 3/16 inches 3.02 cm) in height consisting of the shield, crest and motto of the coat of arms.
Symbolism
The shield is red for Artillery. The bordure is in the colors of the corps distinguishing flag to indicate Corps Artillery. The crest represents the West Coast, the present assignment of the regiment; and inasmuch as a demi-sun also has the appearance of a rising sun it may also represent the origin of the organization on the East Coast.
Background
The distinctive unit insignia was originally approved for the 32nd Field Artillery, Regular Army Inactive on 9 July 1937. It was redesignated for the 32nd Field Artillery Battalion on 2 January 1941. It was amended to change the motto on 7 May 1941. It was redesignated for the 32nd Artillery Regiment on 30 April 1958. It was amended to correct the description on 18 June 1958. It was amended to correct the unit designation from Regiment to Battalion on 20 February 1959. It was redesignated for the 32nd Artillery Regiment on 24 July 1959. The insignia was redesignated effective 1 September 1971, for the 32d Field Artillery Regiment.

Coat of arms

Blazon
Shield
Gules, a bordure compony Argent and Azure.
Crest
On a wreath of the colors Argent and Gules a demi-sun in splendor triparted barwise Or, Tenné and Gules.
Motto
PROUD AMERICANS.
Symbolism
Shield
The shield is red for Artillery. The bordure is in the colors of the corps distinguishing flag to indicate Corps Artillery.
Crest
The crest represents the West Coast, the present assignment of the regiment; and inasmuch as a demi-sun also has the appearance of a rising sun it may also represent the origin of the organization on the East Coast.

Background
The coat of arms was originally approved for the 32nd Field Artillery, Regular Army Inactive on 9 July 1937. It was redesignated for the 32nd Field Artillery Battalion on 11 January 1941. It was amended to change the motto on 7 May 1941. It was redesignated for the 32nd Artillery Regiment on 30 April 1958. It was amended to correct the unit designation from Regiment to Battalion on 20 February 1959. It was redesignated for the 32nd Artillery Regiment on 24 July 1959. The insignia was redesignated effective 1 September 1971, for the 32d Field Artillery Regiment.

Battalions 
The regiment consists of six battalions.

1st Battalion 
The 1st Battalion 32nd Field Artillery Regiment "Proud Americans" was a Lance Missile battalion garrisoned at Fliegerhorst Kaserne in the Erlensee area of Hanau, West Germany from 1960 when it was activated as an Honest John unit. 1st Battalion later became a Lance battalion from 1974 through 1992 when it became part of 3rd Armored Division, V Corps and returned to Fort Sill to become a Multiple Launch Rocket System (MLRS) unit which it remains today. 1/32 FA consisted of 5 Batteries: Alpha, Bravo, Charlie, Headquarters, and Service Batteries, and was inactivated in 1992 as a Lance Missile unit and reactivated as a Multiple Launch Rocket System (MLRS) unit. The unit patch worn was the 41st FA Brigade which was under V Corps Artillery until August 1991 when it joined 3rd Armored Division (Spearhead) and adopted its patch before returning to Fort Sill in 1992 to become a MLRS battalion.

2nd Battalion 

The 2nd Battery, 32nd Field Artillery Regiment, the "Proud Americans", has existed, off and on, since 1918. It has participated in World War II, Vietnam, and the current War on Terrorism. In 2006, 2nd Battery, 32nd Field Artillery was activated as part of 4th Brigade Combat Team, 1st Infantry Division at Ft. Riley, Kansas. The battalion deployed to Baghdad, Iraq in February 2007 in support of Operation Iraqi Freedom (OIF) 07-08 as part of "The Surge." From February 2007 - April 2008, 2-32FA conducted infantry and security operations in southeast Mansour, Baghdad and established and manned Joint Security Station (JSS) Torch with Iraqi Defense & Police.

Pre-World War II
Organized at Camp Meade, Maryland, in 1918, the 32nd Field Artillery Regiment was in training at the end of World War I. Inactivated without deploying, the battalion remained inactive until October 1940, when 2nd Battery, 7th Field Artillery redesignated as the 32nd Field Artillery Regiment, 1st Infantry Division.

World War II
On 8 November 1942, the Proud Americans claimed the first artillery round fired by US artillery against enemies in Europe and North Africa. Later, the battalion would see action at Kasserine and El Guettar.

In 1944, the 32nd Field Artillery was the first complete artillery unit in action on Omaha Beach and is credited with the first Allied field artillery round fired during the invasion.

Advancing across Europe, the battalion continued its trend of firsts by being credited with the first rounds fired onto German soil.
Presidential Unit Citation, World War II, Streamer embroidered EL GUETTAR
French Croix de Guerre with Palm, World War II, Streamer embroidered KASSERINE
French Croix de Guerre with Palm, World War II, Streamer embroidered NORMANDY
French Croix de Guerre, World War II, Fourragere
Belgian Fourragere 1940
Cited in the Order of the Day of the Belgian Army for action at Mons
Cited in the Order of the Day of the Belgian Army for action at Eupen-Malmedy

Following occupation duty and a return to the United States in 1955, the battalion was again de-activated, this time furling its colors at Fort Riley, Kansas.

Vietnam
In 1963, 2nd Battalion, 32nd Artillery, now a 175 mm self-propelled howitzer unit, activated at Fort Sill, Oklahoma. Two years later, another deployment, this time to Vietnam, led to six more years of overseas duty, over 400,000 rounds fired, two Valorous Unit Awards, three Battery-level Valorous Unit Awards, two Meritorious Unit Awards, and several unit awards from the Republic of Vietnam.

Valorous Unit Award, Streamer embroidered CU CHI DISTRICT
Valorous Unit Award, Streamer embroidered TAY NINH PROVINCE
Meritorious Unit Commendation (Army), Streamer embroidered VIETNAM 1965–1966
Meritorious Unit Commendation (Army), Streamer embroidered VIETNAM 1968–1969
Republic of Vietnam Cross of Gallantry with Palm, Streamer embroidered VIETNAM 1965–1968
Republic of Vietnam Cross of Gallantry with Palm, Streamer embroidered VIETNAM 1968–1970
Republic of Vietnam Cross of Gallantry with Palm, Streamer embroidered VIETNAM 1970–1971
Republic of Vietnam Cross of Gallantry with Palm, Streamer embroidered VIETNAM 1971
Republic of Vietnam Civil Action Honor Medal, First Class, Streamer embroidered VIETNAM 1965–1971

Battery A additionally entitled to:
Valorous Unit Award, Streamer embroidered TAY NINH PROVINCE 1970
Valorous Unit Award, Streamer embroidered FISH HOOK

Battery B additionally entitled to:
Valorous Unit Award, Streamer embroidered FISH HOOK

Inactive years, Desert Storm and drawdown
Inactivated at Fort Lewis in 1972, the battalion spent 15 years on the inactive roll until its activation on 16 August 1987 as a member of the 42d FA Brigade. The battalion was equipped with Lance missiles until 1989, when the battalion was inactivated once again. In 1990 the battalion was activated in Giessen, Germany as the first active ATACMS capable MLRS unit. When USAREUR was tasked with providing units for deployment for Desert Shield it was decided that the battalion and its ATACMS capability should remain in Germany as a strategic theater-level deterrent to the Soviets. However, a select number of soldiers from the battalion were attached to other deploying MLRS units  to bring them up to 100% strength. After Desert Storm, the unit was reassigned to 41st FA Brigade.  After the reunification of Germany and the collapse of the Soviet Union, the battalion cased its colors once again, on 15 December 1993 in Giessen, Germany.

Modern
Activated 16 January 2006 at Fort Riley, Kansas.

From February 2007 until April 2008, the 2nd Battalion, 32nd Field Artillery, Task Force Patriot, as part of the 4th Brigade Combat Team (Dragon Brigade), 1st Infantry Division (United States) served in northwest Baghdad where it conducted dismounted infantry operations to secure the populace and defeat extremist, insurgent, and criminal threats to security.
For this deployment, the Battalion was awarded the following VUA:

Valorous Unit Award, Streamer embroidered BAGHDAD 2007-2008

From 2009 until 2010, the 2nd Battalion, 32nd Field Artillery, Task Force Patriot, as part of the 4th Brigade Combat Team (Dragon Brigade), 1st Infantry Division (United States) served in Tikrit, Iraq where it continued to conduct dismounted infantry operations to secure the populace and defeat extremist, insurgent, and criminal threats to security. 2/32 was the last combat unit to leave Iraq at the conclusion of Operation Iraqi Freedom. For this deployment, the Battalion was awarded the following MUC:

Meritorious Unit Commendation (Army), Streamer embroidered IRAQ 2009-2010

From May 2012 until February 2013, the 2nd Battalion, 32nd Field Artillery, Task Force Dragon, as part of the 4th Brigade Combat Team, 1st Infantry Division served in RC East Afghanistan, Paktika province, where the unit conducted counter-fire operations to guarantee security for the populace along the Pakistan border and cease Taliban, Haqqani, insurgent, networks and activity. The unit also participated and started the first training of Afghan National Army artillery units in Paktika. These efforts allowed the ANA to fire their first autonomous combat missions in support of their own troops engaged with insurgent activities. The 2nd Battalion, 32nd Field Artillery, were able to conduct join fire missions with the ANA D-30 units.

The 2nd Battalion, 32nd Field Artillery, also continued their tradition of "firsts" with the first rounds fired for the 1st Infantry Division in Afghanistan. For this deployment, the Battalion was once again awarded the MUC, perpetuating a multi-generational record of stellar military achievement:

Meritorious Unit Commendation (Army), Streamer embroidered AFGHANISTAN 2012-2013

In 2015, the 2nd Battalion, 32nd Field Artillery Regiment replaced 2nd Battalion, 320th Field Artillery Regiment to become the 101st Airborne Division's air assault artillery unit for the 1st Infantry Brigade Combat Team.

See also
Field Artillery Branch (United States)

References

Further reading

External links

101st Airborne Division
1918 establishments in Maryland
032
Military units and formations established in 1918